Crispino is an Italian-language occupational surname and name, literally meaning "cobbler".

The surname may refer to:
Mike Crispino, American sportscaster
Armando Crispino,  Italian film director and screenwriter
Jesús Eduardo Corso Crispino, Uruguayan lawyer, agricultural journalist and writer

Occupational surnames
Italian-language surnames